Jalan Changkat Keruing (Perak state route A12) is a major road in Perak, Malaysia.

List of junctions

Changkat Keruing